Howard E. Koch (December 12, 1901 – August 17, 1995) was an American playwright and screenwriter who was blacklisted by the Hollywood film studio bosses in the 1950s.

Background
Born to a Jewish family in New York City, Koch grew up in Kingston, New York, and was a graduate of St. Stephen's College (1922, later renamed Bard College) and Columbia Law School (1925).

Career

While practicing law in Hartsdale, New York, he began to write plays. Great Scott (1929), Give Us This Day (1933), and In Time to Come (1941) were produced on Broadway.

Koch's began playwriting in the late 1920s, before he started working on radio scripts. His radio work in the 1930s as a writer for the CBS Mercury Theater of the Air included the Orson Welles radio drama The War of the Worlds (1938), which allegedly caused nationwide panic among some listeners for its documentary-like portrayal of an invasion of spaceships from Mars. Koch later wrote a play about the panic, Invasion from Mars, which was later adapted into the 1975 TV movie, The Night That Panicked America, in which actor Joshua Bryant plays Koch.

In the 1940s, Koch began writing for Hollywood studios. His first accepted works were screenplays for Michael Curtiz's The Sea Hawk, William Wyler's The Letter. Koch contributed to the popular film Casablanca with Humphrey Bogart, which he co-scripted with writers Julius and Philip Epstein in 1942, and for which he received an Academy Award in 1943. He also wrote Shining Victory (1941) and Letter from an Unknown Woman (1948), his favorite screenplay.

In 1943, at the request of Jack L. Warner of Warner Bros., Koch wrote the screenplay for Mission to Moscow (1943). The movie subsequently spawned controversy because of its positive portrayal of Joseph Stalin and the Soviet Union. After the war, Koch was dismissed after he was denounced as a Communist. He was then criticized by the House Un-American Activities Committee (HUAC) for his outspoken leftist political views. Koch was blacklisted by Hollywood in 1951.

After being blacklisted, Koch moved with his wife Anne (an accomplished writer in her own right) and their family to Europe and eventually took up residence in the United Kingdom with other blacklisted writers, where they wrote for five years for film and television (British television series The Adventures of Robin Hood among them) under the pseudonyms "Peter Howard" and "Anne Rodney". In 1956, they returned to the United States and settled in Woodstock, New York. Koch sought help from high-profile lawyer Ed Williams in order to clear his name from Hollywood's blacklist. Koch was promptly removed from the blacklist, and he resumed his name and continued to write plays and books and remained actively committed to progressive political and social justice causes. His last Hollywood screenplay was for The Fox in 1968.

Death
Koch died age 94 in 1995 in Kingston, New York.

Works

Plays
 Invasion from Mars, (with Orson Welles) (pl) CBS, October 30, 1938.

Books
 Invasion from Mars, ed. Orson Welles, Dell 1949.
 The Panic Broadcast, Little, Brown and Company 1970, Avon Books 1971.
 Casablanca: Script and Legend, Overlook Press 1973.
 As Time Goes By: Memoirs of a Writer, Harcourt Brace Jovanovich 1979.

Short stories
 "Invasion from Inner Space", in Star Science Fiction Stories #6, ed. Frederik Pohl, Ballantine 1959.

Anthologies
Invaders of Earth, ed. Groff Conklin, Vanguard 1952, Pocket 1955, Tempo 1962.
The Treasury of Science Fiction Classics, ed. Harold W. Kuebler, Hanover House 1954.
The Armchair Science Reader, ed. Isabel S. Gordon & Sophie Sorkin, Simon & Schuster 1959.
Enemies in Space, ed. Groff Conklin, Digit 1962.
Contact, ed. Noel Keyes, Paperback Library 1963.
Speculations, ed. Thomas E. Sanders, Glencoe Press 1973.
Bug-Eyed Monsters, ed. Anthony Cheetham, Panther 1974.

References

External links
 

 
Howard Koch at Bard Archives.

1901 births
1995 deaths
American radio writers
American male screenwriters
Columbia Law School alumni
Jewish American screenwriters
Hollywood blacklist
Writers from New York City
Best Adapted Screenplay Academy Award winners
People from Kingston, New York
People from Woodstock, New York
People from Hartsdale, New York
Bard College alumni
Screenwriters from New York (state)
20th-century American male writers
20th-century American screenwriters
20th-century American Jews